Yacht Club Costa Smeralda was established by the Aga Khan in 1967.  It is situated at Porto Cervo in Costa Smeralda, northern Sardinia and provides services for recreational sailors.

The club challenged for the 1983 America's Cup with Azzurra in Newport, Rhode Island, coming third.  In 1984, it hosted the World 12-Metre Class championship, and in 1987 challenged for the America's Cup with Azzurra '87 off Fremantle, Western Australia.  The club was chosen by the Royal Perth Yacht Club as the Challenger of Record for the 1987 edition.

See also
 Italy at the America's Cup
 Cino Ricci

References

External links
 

Yacht clubs in Italy
America's Cup yacht clubs
1987 America's Cup
Sport in Sardinia
1967 establishments in Italy